Barry Denny was an Irish politician.

Denny was born in County Cork and educated at Trinity College, Dublin.

He represented Tralee from 1717 to 1727.

References

Irish MPs 1695–1699
Members of the Parliament of Ireland (pre-1801) for County Kerry constituencies
18th-century Irish people
Alumni of Trinity College Dublin
People from County Cork